Lactifluus jetiae is a species of mushroom-forming fungus in the family Russulaceae. It was described by Luke Vaughan, Lachlan Tegart, James K. Douch, and Teresa Lebel in 2021. The specific epithet is a Latinisation of the initials JET, in honour of Jennifer E. Tonkin, who had collected and preliminarily analysed many Australian members of the Russulaceae. The type locality is near the Cann River, Australia.

See also 
 
 List of Lactifluus species
 Fungi of Australia

References

External links 
 

jetiae
Fungi described in 2021
Fungi of Australia
Taxa named by Teresa Lebel